Rodolfo Frascoli is an Italian motorcycle designer.

Career 
At age 14 he won his first design competition and a few years later began his career alongside Luciano Marabese, historic name of the Italian motorcycle design, unleashing his passion for motorcycle and design in general.

From 1997 to 2010 he held the position of director of the design center at Marabese Design.

In 2010 founded the Frascoli Design as an independent consultant designer for prestigious motorcycle brands.

In over 30 years many successful motorcycles and scooters emerged from his pencil, including:

References
 
 http://www.inmoto.it/news/approfondimenti/indimenticabili/2019/05/29-2157580/le_indimenticabili_moto_guzzi_stelvio_1200/
 https://www.ilsole24ore.com/art/motori/2019-06-10/suzuki-katana-ritorna-mitica-sportiva-081815.shtml?uuid=AC32RKM&refresh_ce=1
 https://www.motociclismo.it/suzuki-katana-video-designer-rodolfo-frascoli-campione-scherma-alfredo-rota-73273
 https://www.gazzetta.it/Passione-Motori/20-04-2019/suzuki-katana-2019-l-intervista-designer-rodolfo-frascoli-330922165216.shtml
 https://www.dueruote.it/news/attualita/2020/06/23/triumph-tiger-900-designer-rodolfo-frascoli.html
 https://www.dueruote.it/news/moto-scooter/2020/08/25/triumph-trident-2021-concept.html https://www.repubblica.it/motori/sezioni/moto/2020/08/27/news/trident_ecco_la_moto_del_futuro_triumph-265597776/
 https://www.dueruote.it/news/attualita/2020/06/23/triumph-tiger-900-designer-rodolfo-frascoli.html
https://www.quotidianomotori.com/moto/askoll-ngs3-by-helmo-milano/
 https://motori.iltabloid.it/2021/03/31/triumph-trident-660-una-entry-level-superior.html

https://www.moto.it/prove/mondial-piega-125-una-grande-per-piccoli.html/amp

External links

Italian motorcycle designers
Year of birth missing (living people)
Living people